Minnesota State Highway 282 (MN 282) is a  highway in Minnesota, which runs from its intersection with U.S. Highway 169 in Jordan and continues east to its eastern terminus at its intersection with State Highway 13 in Spring Lake Township near Prior Lake.

The route passes through the communities of Jordan, Sand Creek Township, and Spring Lake Township.

Route description

Highway 282 serves as an east–west route between Jordan and Spring Lake Township near Prior Lake.

The route is also known as:

2nd Street in the city of Jordan
Country Trail West in Sand Creek Township
Country Trail East in Spring Lake Township

Highway 282 has a junction with Marystown Road (County 15) in Sand Creek Township, south of Shakopee.

The route is legally defined as Route 282 in the Minnesota Statutes.

History
Highway 282 was authorized on July 1, 1949.

The route was paved in 1951.

From April 2009 to July 2009, the section of Highway 282 in the city of Jordan (2nd Street) was reconstructed between Creek Lane and Broadway Street (Highway 21).  New streetlights were installed and the route was given a new pavement surface.

Major intersections

References

External links

Highway 282 at the Unofficial Minnesota Highways Page

282
Transportation in Scott County, Minnesota